San Carlos Street is a major east-west city street in San Jose, California. It consists of two unconnected parts. The western part is an arterial road from Stevens Creek Boulevard to Eleventh St, and the eastern part is a residential street from South 10th Street to South Seventeenth Street. Major intersections include Buena Vista Avenue, Muller Place, Meridian Avenue, Race Street, and Leigh Avenue.

Route description

Western segment 
San Carlos Street begins in the west at Bascom Avenue as a continuation of Stevens Creek Boulevard. It then heads east as a four-lane road toward Downtown San Jose. On this section, San Carlos Street has several signalized intersections.

After meeting CA-87, San Carlos Street continues for 0.7 more miles before terminating near San Jose State University in Downtown San Jose.

Eastern segment 
To the east of San Jose State University, San Carlos Street begins again at an intersection with South 10th Street. It then continues as a residential street for 0.4 miles before ending at South 17th Street.

History 
At the start of the 1900s, commercial development on the Stevens Creek Road/San Carlos Street corridor was increasing. It was made into a major road stretching across San Jose. In 1933, viaducts were constructed to carry San Carlos Street over the Los Gatos Creek and SP tracks.

References 

Streets in San Jose, California
Roads in Santa Clara County, California